Terraconia rolani is a species of very small or minute freshwater snail with an operculum, an aquatic gastropod mollusk in the family Hydrobiidae.

References

Gastropods described in 2000
Hydrobiidae